Mjømna is an island in Gulen Municipality in Vestland county, Norway.  The island sits off the mainland coast in southwestern Gulen, and it is part of a large archipelago of islands.  The main islands that surround Mjømna include Byrknesøyna (to the west), Sandøyna (to the east), and Hiserøyna (to the northeast).  The Fensfjorden flows south of the island and the Gulafjorden and Sognesjøen flow along the north of the island.

There were 60 people living on the island in 2001, and the majority of them live on the western side of the island in the village of Mjømna, where Mjømna Church is located.

See also
List of islands of Norway

References

Islands of Vestland
Gulen